Shou may refer to:

Robin Shou (b. 1960), a Chinese American actor
The Chinese character shou (寿/壽) that means "longevity"
Shou, the Chinese god of longevity, one of the Sanxing
Shou County, a county in China
Shō (given name), a masculine Japanese given name
Shō (instrument), a Japanese instrument
Shō, a traditional Japanese unit of volume equal to 1.8L
Shou Ronpo, a character from Uchu Sentai Kyuranger